Villa Orias (Tarvita) is a town and administrative centre in Tarvita Municipality, Azurduy Province, Chuquisaca Department of Bolivia. It is in the Cordillera Oriental of the Andes, where the Puca Mayu River and the Cruz Mayu River meet to form the Tarvita River.

Notes

Populated places in Chuquisaca Department